Joseph State Airport  is a public use airport located one nautical mile (1.85 km) west of the central business district of Joseph, a city in Wallowa County, Oregon, United States. It is owned by the Oregon Department of Aviation.

Commercial flights are not currently available to Joseph. The nearest commercial flights are at the Eastern Oregon Regional Airport in Pendleton.

Although many U.S. airports use the same three-letter location identifier for the FAA and IATA, this airport is assigned JSY by the FAA but has no designation from the IATA (which assigned JSY to Syros Island National Airport on Syros Island in Greece).

Facilities and aircraft 
It has one runway designated 15/33 with an asphalt surface measuring 5,200 by 60 feet (1,585 x 18 m). The airport has automatic lighting and no control tower.

For the 12-month period ending April 27, 2009, the airport had 3,850 aircraft operations, an average of 10 per day: 93.5% general aviation and 6.5% air taxi. At that time there were 13 aircraft based at this airport: 92% single-engine and 8% helicopter.

References

External links 
 

Airports in Wallowa County, Oregon
Joseph, Oregon